Dragan Đokanović (Serbian Cyrillic: Драган Ђокановић; born 20 April 1958) is a Bosnian Serb politician, member, founder and president of the Democratic Party of Federalists, physician, sportsman and one of the most popular men in history of Bosnia and Herzegovina by the research of The Massachusetts Institute of Technology.

Biography
Born on 20 April 1958, Đokanović completed all of his formal schooling in his hometown of Sarajevo, including university and medical school. He received his medical degree in 1984 from Sarajevo University. Pediatrician by medical specialty and training, he completed his residency in Pediatrics from 1988 to 1992. Đokanović worked in Zvornik, Šekovići, Belgrade and Sarajevo. He currently resides in Istočno Sarajevo and works at a children's medical clinic (KCUS) in Sarajevo.
He is married and has two sons.

Political career

Sine the year 1990, Đokanović has been involved in politics in Bosnia and Herzegovina. He was engaged in the following activities during the following periods:

In May 1990 he formed Democratic Party of Federalists.
In November 1990 he was engaged in the campaign for the first multi-party elections in Bosnia and Herzegovina.
From 1991 Dragan Đokanović was involved in activities in relation to preserving the Federal Republic of Yugoslavia as the only guarantee of peace in Bosnia.
From the founding of the Assembly of the Serbian People of Bosnia and Herzegovina on 24 October 1991 Dragan Đokanović attended the sessions of the Assembly. He attend sessions of this Assembly until the summer of 1994.
In June 1992 he was appointed War Commissioner by the Presidency of the Serbian Republic of Bosnia and Herzegovina and he was responsible for the establishment of War Commissions in the municipalities of Vlasenica, Zvornik, Šekovići, Bratunac and Skelani. Dragan Đokanović informed the members of the Presidency that war crimes were taking place in those Municipalities.

In March 2005 and in November 2009, he was the witness in front of the International Criminal Tribunal for the former Yugoslavia in The Hague. From July 1992 to January 1993, Đokanović acted as an adviser to the War Presidency of the Serbian Republic. He advised the Presidency in relation to the establishment of Republika Srpska and relationship between the organs of the Republic from the Republic level to the Municipal level.

From January 1993 to Spring 1994, Đokanović was the Minister of War Veterans Affairs in Republika Srpska.
At the beginning of 1994 he re-activated the Democratic Party of Federalists and
established official contacts with the SPS party Slobodan Milošević. In February 1994 there was a meeting in Skelani with representatives of his party and the representatives the SPS and it was agreed that we would participate in activities to stop the war in Bosni and Herzegovina.

In February 1995, Đokanović called a press conference and proposed plan that is very similar to the Dayton Agreement.
After the Dayton accords at the beginning of 1996 he was involved in the preelection campaign.  At this time Dragan Đokanović attempted to keep the Serbs in Sarajevo but he had great difficulties with the leaders of the SDS party Radovan Karadžić in respect of this issue.
In January 1997, Đokanović moved to Belgrade, Serbia and established Democratic Party of Federalists in Serbia. The party was officially registered in 2003.
In December 2007, Đokanović, as the opponent of Milorad Dodik's rule, was candidate for President of Republika Srpska. and he received 849 votes (0.21%).

Sport career
Đokanović is a versatile and accomplished athlete. He was a gymnastic champion of Bosnia and Herzegovina and Yugoslavia (at the parallel bars, Novo Mesto (1975)). In Sarajevo, there is a gymnastic club named "Dragan Đokanović".

References

External links

Official Website
derStandard.at
 ICTY

1958 births
Living people
Serbs of Bosnia and Herzegovina
Politicians from Sarajevo
Sportspeople from Sarajevo
Bosnia and Herzegovina pediatricians
Politicians of Republika Srpska
Democratic Party of Federalists politicians